Righter is a dating app targeted at American conservatives. It was founded by former banker Christy Edwards Lawton, in order to create a dating app for conservatives who felt rejected by apps like Tinder and Bumble. It is amongst a new wave of apps that notes discrimination against conservatives, including Donald Daters and Conservatives Only.

Values
Christy Edwards Lawton founded Righter in order to fill a void for conservative dating apps. With this, there were many conservative values that she saw as being a priority for the new app.

Lawton has claimed that conservatives "have better sex than liberals", claiming "more meaningful sex" and "better orgasms". The app has been accused of being against the transgender community, by only allowing two gender identities on the app. Additionally, the app was built for heterosexual couples, and has also been accused of being homophobic. The founder has said that women must "close their legs", and "be feminine" rather than feminist.

See also
 Comparison of online dating services
 Tinder
 Conservatism in the United States

References

Online dating for specific interests
Online dating services of the United States